The South Alabama Jaguars softball team represents the University of South Alabama in NCAA Division I college softball. The team participates in the Sun Belt Conference. The Jaguars are currently led by fifteenth-year head coach Becky Clark, a position she's held since the program started in 2007.  The team plays its home games at Jaguar Field located on the outskirts of the university's campus.

NCAA Regional appearances

Year-by-year results

Head coaches

See also
List of NCAA Division I softball programs

References

External links